Dub, Dubs, or dubbing may refer to:

Places
 County Dublin, Ireland, Chapman code DUB
 Dub (Hadžići), a village in Bosnia and Herzegovina
 Dub (Rogatica), a village in Bosnia and Herzegovina
 Dub, Travnik, a village in Bosnia and Herzegovina
 Dub (Prachatice District), a town in the Czech Republic
 Dub, Kotor, a village in Montenegro
 Dub, Tomaszów Lubelski County, a village in Poland
 Dub (Bajina Bašta), a village in Serbia
 Dub, Arkansas, an unincorporated community in the United States

Music
 Dub music, a subgenre of reggae music
 Dubbing (music), transfer or copying of previously recorded audio material from one medium to another
 The Dubs, American 1950s doo-wop vocal group

Literature and publishing
 Dub (magazine), a North American magazine covering the urban custom car culture
 The Dubs: Dublin GAA since the 1940s, a 2006 book about the Gaelic football team

Sports
 Dublin GAA, an Irish Gaelic football team
 Dubs, live mascot for the Washington Huskies athletic teams
 The Dubs, a nickname for the Golden State Warriors National Basketball Association team
 Dubuque Dubs, a Dubuque, Iowa minor league baseball team from 1906 to 1915

People

Medieval period
 Dub Calgaid mac Laidcnén (died 769), King of the Uí Cheinnselaig of South Leinster
 Dub Dá Leithe mac Tomaltach (died 816), King of Uí Maine
 Dub Lémna ingen Tighearnáin (died 943), Queen of Ireland  
 Dub, King of Scotland (died 967), King of Alba
 Dub Chablaigh ingen Cathal (died 1009), Queen of Ireland
 Dub dá Leithe (died 1064), Abbot of Armagh
 Máel Dub (died 675), Irish monk
 Amlaíb Dub, Olaf the Black (died 1237), sea-king who ruled the Isle of Man and parts of the Hebrides

Modern era
 Dub (nickname), a list of people nicknamed "Dub" or "Dubs"
 Dubs (surname), a list of people surnamed Dubs
 Gene Dub (born 1943), Canadian architect and former politician
 Dub FX (born 1983), Australian street performer and studio recording artist

Abbreviations
 Deubiquitinating enzyme, essential component of the ubiquitin-proteasome system
 Down Under Bowl, annual high school football competition in Australia
 Dubitative mood, an epistemic grammatical mood found in some languages
 Dysfunctional uterine bleeding, a medical condition

Other uses
 The Dub, a lost 1919 American silent comedy film
 Dubbing (filmmaking), post-production process in which additional or supplementary recording occurs
 Dub poetry, a form of performance poetry consisting of spoken word over reggae rhythms
 DUB (cuneiform), a sign in cuneiform writing
 Dub (wheel), an automobile wheel or rim that is twenty or more inches in diameter
 Dubbing (poultry), the procedure of removing the comb, wattles and sometimes earlobes of poultry
 shortened name for the letter W
 Accolade (also known as dubbing), central act in rite of passage ceremonies conferring knighthood
 Dübs and Company, a locomotive works in Glasgow, Scotland
 DUB, IATA airport code for Dublin Airport, Ireland

See also

 Dub-Indrecht mac Cathail (died 768), King of Connacht
 Doubs, a department in the Franche-Comté region of France
 Doubs (river) in eastern France
 Dubbin, a wax product used to soften, condition and waterproof leather
 Dubbins, a surname
 U-dub (disambiguation), nickname of several American universities whose names start with the letter W